Paul M. Gagnon is an American attorney who served as the United States Attorney for the District of New Hampshire from 1993 to 2001. He was previously elected Hillsborough County Attorney in 1982 and 1984.

References

Living people
United States Attorneys for the District of New Hampshire
New Hampshire Democrats
Year of birth missing (living people)